Salisbury is a northern suburb in Adelaide, South Australia. It is the seat of the City of Salisbury, and in the South Australian Legislative Assembly electoral district of Ramsay and the Australian House of Representatives division of Spence. The suburb is a service area for the City of Salisbury district, with an abundance of parklands, shops, cafes and restaurants. Parabanks Shopping Centre is also located in Salisbury, which includes Woolworths, Coles and Big W as its signature retailers.

History
Salisbury was founded when John Harvey began selling town allotments in 1848, from land he had purchased along the Little Para River in the previous year. The town was named after Salisbury in the United Kingdom which was close to his wife's hometown. There is a Wiltshire Street near Park Terrace in the city centre, parallel to John Street. Salisbury started its life as a service centre for the surrounding wheat and hay farms. Salisbury Post Office opened around March 1850.

Salisbury railway station was built in 1857, and is where the standard gauge line to Crystal Brook diverges from the broad gauge to Gawler. Until the 1980s, this line was broad gauge. In 1985 Salisbury station was rebuilt by the State Transport Authority as a bus/rail interchange. This was the second purpose-built transport interchange in the Adelaide metropolitan area (the first had been at Noarlunga Centre).

Salisbury grew slowly from a town population numbered between 400 and 500 in 1881. The District Council of Salisbury was established in 1933 (amalgamating Yatala North south of the Little Para and Munno Para West to the north) which centered local governance of the area on the main population centre between Enfield and Gawler, the township of Salisbury.

In 1940 an explosives and filling factory, the Salisbury Explosives Factory, was established at Penfield just to the north, for which employee housing was added at Salisbury. The population of the district doubled the population almost overnight to more than 4000, most of this being concentrated in the township of Salisbury.

Two South Australian Australian Labor Party leaders, Lynn Arnold (Premier 1992–1993) and Mike Rann (Premier 2002–2011) both represented the Salisbury area in the South Australian Parliament. Arnold was elected as the MP for Ramsay, and then Taylor, and Rann was elected as the MP for Briggs and Ramsay.

Demographics
52.1% were born in Australia, other countries of birth were England 4.2%, Bhutan 4%, Myanmar 3.8%, Afghanistan 3.7% and Nepal 3.3%.

52.2% spoke English only used at home. Other languages spoken at home are Nepali 8.0%, Hazaraghi 3.6%, Italian 3%, Vietnamese 2.2% and Arabic 1.9%.

Transport 
Trains to and from Adelaide and Gawler from Salisbury operate every 15 minutes at off-peak times on Monday to Friday, and every 30 minutes during the day on Saturday and Sunday. In the evening, services run every hour. In morning peak hours, there are several trains that run non-stop between Salisbury and Adelaide (or make only one stop, at Mawson Interchange).  These are used by a significant number of city workers who either park their vehicle or transfer from buses at Salisbury Interchange.

Local buses from Salisbury Interchange, scheduled to connect with trains to and from Adelaide, use the Adelaide Metro integrated ticketing system.  In May 2012 there are 13 local bus routes providing links to many of the northern suburbs, such as routes 400 and 430 to Elizabeth, route 415V to Golden Grove, routes 224, 225, 411 to Mawson Lakes, routes 225, 500, 502, 560 to Para Hills, routes 401, 411 to Paralowie and routes 404, 405 to Parafield Gardens.

Retail 
The major retail zone in Salisbury is the Parabanks Shopping Centre, which is a short distance from Salisbury Interchange, and was first opened around 1977. The single-floor complex includes 74 stores and 3 anchor stores, with a total floor area of 23,800 m2, and around 1,400 parking spaces. In April 2008, property group Stockland sold the shopping centre to the Angaet Group. In 2015, an $18 million redevelopment of the centre was approved by the Salisbury Council's Development Assessment Panel. The redevelopment consisted of three stages, with five specialty stores added to the eastern side mall, the relocation of the Coles supermarket into the site of the former Harris Scarfe store, and external upgrades which were completed in October 2017.

Gallery

See also

List of Adelaide suburbs

References

Suburbs of Adelaide